Royal jelly is a substance secreted by honey bees to aid in the development of immature or young bees.

Royal jelly may also refer to:
 "Royal Jelly" (short story), a short story by Roald Dahl
 Jaymz Bee and the Royal Jelly Orchestra, a Canadian lounge music and jazz band
 Royal Jelly, an album by American rock singer Johnny Edwards